David Appolon (born March 8, 1992), best known by his stage name Gio Dee, is an American hip-hop artist/songwriter from Boston, Massachusetts. He is the founder of the Chef Boyz, a music group based out of the greater Boston Area. Appolon Mind Yo Business EP was released in December 2015. It features Metro Boomin, MadeinTYO, Iamsu! and TM88.

Overview 

Boston rapper, Gio Dee, garnered national attention when social media sensation, Jerry Purpdrank, posted his "Mind Yo Business" song on a Vine that ultimately went viral, and collected more than 1 million views on YouTube. Just weeks before Christmas, 2015, Gio released his Mind Yo Business EP, which features production by Metro Boomin & TM88, as well as guest appearances by Bay Area native Iamsu. and Atlanta newcomer MadeinTYO. The success of the EP lead to Gio opening up for Lil Uzi Vert at Middle East, G-Eazy at the HOB Boston, and Iamsu!'s 14 city "Eyes On Me Tour" with Mod Sun, Gravez and Salma Slims in the summer of 2016.

Gio released his first full-length project, Never Going Back, April 28, 2017 in partnership with Black 17 Media, a subsidiary of Sony RED. This album featured Iamsu!, Lil Rich and Eli Sostre. In September 2019, he also appeared on Marc E. Bassy's album, Post Modern Depression.

On January 17, 2020, Gio released his second full-length studio album with production from DJ Shabazz, Iamsu!, Marc E. Bassy, Polo  and One-H.

Mixtapes

References

External links
 Bostonglobe.com
 M.xxlmag.com
 Youngcalifornia.com
 Respect-mag.com
 Worldstarhiphop.com
 Reverbnation.com
 Thefreshheir.com
 Newenglandhiphop.com

1992 births
Living people
Rappers from Boston
21st-century American rappers